The 2006 Greek local elections elected representatives to Greece's 3 super-prefectures, 54 prefectures, provinces, and approximately 1,033 communities and municipalities. 

The elections took place on Sunday, 15 October 2006 from 7am to 7pm.

According to the New Code for Municipalities and Communities, a platform gains the absolute majority of the seats if it has more than 42% of the votes. If no platform achieves that, then there is a second round, one week later.  The ballot in the second round includes the two platforms which garnered the most votes in the 1st week.

Traditionally, candidates at local elections do not run under the official name of the party they belong, but form electoral platforms with different names for the purpose.

Elections

Municipal mayoralties

Municipality of Athens

Municipality of Piraeus

Municipality of Thessaloniki

Super-Prefectural elections

Athens-Piraeus

Drama-Kavala-Xanthi

Evros-Rhodope

Prefectural elections

Athens Prefecture

Note: There was no separate election for the position of prefect (nomarch); the nomarchs was appointed according to the results of the election in the super-prefecture.)

Piraeus Prefecture

Note: There was no separate election for the position of prefect (nomarch); the nomarchs was appointed according to the results of the election in the super-prefecture.)

Thessaloniki Prefecture

Notes

2006
Local elections
2006 elections in Greece
October 2006 events in Europe